Hancock Middle/High School is located in Hancock, New York, United States. It is the single high school for the Hancock Central School District.

References

External links
 Official website

Public high schools in New York (state)
Public middle schools in New York (state)
Schools in Delaware County, New York